Ariel Esteban Broggi (born 15 January 1983) is an Argentine football coach and former player. He is the current assistant manager of Brazilian club Atlético Mineiro. 

Broggi played mainly as a left back, appearing for Vélez Sársfield,  Banfield, Ankaragücü and Quilmes.

Career
Born in San Martín, Buenos Aires Province, Broggi started his career in 2003 at Vélez Sársfield where he played 100 games, scoring one goal. At the end of 2005 Clausura Tournament Broggi played most of the games in Vélez' championship winning campaign. However, he lost his place to Marcelo Bustamante at the end of the tournament. In 2007, he was transferred to Banfield.

On 31 August 2009 Broggi transferred on loan to Ankaragücü on a one-year contract. For the 2010–11 season, he returned to Argentina to play on loan with Quilmes.

Honours

Player
Vélez Sársfield
Argentine Primera División: 2005 Clausura

References

External links
 Argentine Primera statiastics

1983 births
Living people
People from San Martín, Buenos Aires
Argentine footballers
Argentine expatriate footballers
Association football defenders
Club Atlético Banfield footballers
MKE Ankaragücü footballers
Club Atlético Vélez Sarsfield footballers
Quilmes Atlético Club footballers
Argentine Primera División players
Süper Lig players
Argentine expatriate sportspeople in Mexico
Argentine expatriate sportspeople in Turkey
Expatriate footballers in Turkey
Sportspeople from Buenos Aires Province